Norway has participated in the Eurovision Young Dancers 13 times since its debut in 1985. Norway has hosted and won the contest once, in 2011.

Participation overview

Hostings

See also
Norway in the Eurovision Song Contest
Norway in the Eurovision Young Musicians
Norway in the Junior Eurovision Song Contest

External links 
 Eurovision Young Dancers 

Countries in the Eurovision Young Dancers